Qipanjing (Chinese: 棋盘井镇) is an urban, secondarily-sectored town in Otog Banner, Ordos City, Inner Mongolia, China. Qipanjing is based around a major industrial coalmine (Yuxing coal mine) which sparked controversies over air pollution in Ordos. Qipanjing had an estimated population growth of 50,000 between 2013 and 2018. Qipanjing has no jurisdictions over any villages.

References 

Populated places in Inner Mongolia